William Dyre was an Englishman, born in Newport, Rhode Island, who served as the 13th Mayor of New York City from October 30, 1680 until 1682. He was a son of the Quaker martyr Mary Dyer and William Dyer (settler).

See also
 List of mayors of New York City

References

Mayors of New York City
English emigrants
1685 deaths
People of the Province of New York
1640 births